Peter Steenhusen (December 31, 1903 – November 6, 1975) was an American politician who served in the Iowa House of Representatives from the 33rd district from 1957 to 1963.

References

1903 births
1975 deaths
Democratic Party members of the Iowa House of Representatives